The Mount Rushmore Anniversary commemorative coins are a series of commemorative coins which were issued by the United States Mint in 1991.

Legislation 
The Mount Rushmore Commemorative Coin Act authorized the production of three coins, a clad half dollar, a silver dollar, and a gold half eagle, to commemorate the 50th anniversary of the dedication of Mount Rushmore.  The act allowed the coins to be struck in both proof and uncirculated finishes. The coins were first released on February 15, 1991.

Designs

Half Dollar

The obverse of the Mount Rushmore Anniversary half dollar, designed by Marcel Jovine, features Mount Rushmore and a sunburst. The reverse, designed by T. James Ferrell, shows a classic image of an American buffalo.

Dollar

The obverse of the Mount Rushmore Anniversary dollar, designed by Marika Somogyi, features the mountainside of Mount Rushmore wreathed in laurel. The reverse, designed by Frank Gasparro, features the Great Seal over a map of the United States, with a star marking the location of Mount Rushmore.

Half eagle

The obverse of the Mount Rushmore Anniversary half eagle, designed by John Mercanti, features the American Eagle in flight over Mount Rushmore and six stars on the right edge. The reverse, designed by Robert Lamb, features a stylized inscription, "Mount Rushmore National Memorial".

Specifications 
Half Dollar
 Display Box Color: Gray
 Edge: Reeded
 Weight: 11.34 grams
 Diameter: 30.61 millimeters; 1.205 inches
 Composition: 92% Copper, 8% Nickel (Cupronickel)

Dollar
 Display Box Color: Gray
 Edge: Reeded
 Weight: 26.730 grams; 0.76 troy ounce
 Diameter: 38.10 millimeters; 1.50 inches
 Composition: 90% Silver, 10% Copper

Half Eagle
 Display Box Color: Gray
 Edge: Reeded
 Weight: 8.359 grams; 0.24 troy ounce
 Diameter: 21.59 millimeters; 0.850 inch
 Composition: 90% Gold, 6% Silver, 4% Copper

See also

 United States commemorative coins
 List of United States commemorative coins and medals (1990s)

References

Modern United States commemorative coins
Gold coins
Silver coins
Eagles on coins
Bison on coins
Mount Rushmore
Maps on coins
Cultural depictions of Abraham Lincoln
Cultural depictions of Thomas Jefferson
Cultural depictions of Theodore Roosevelt
Cultural depictions of George Washington
United States silver coins
United States gold coins